The Chaonians were an ancient Greek tribe that inhabited the region of Epirus currently part of north-western Greece and southern Albania. Together with the Molossians and the Thesprotians, they formed the main tribes of the northwestern Greek group. On their southern frontier lay the Epirote kingdom of the Molossians, to their southwest stood the kingdom of the Thesprotians, and to their north were various Illyrian tribes, as well as the polis of Apollonia. By the 5th century BC, they had conquered and combined to a large degree with the neighboring Thesprotians and Molossians. The Chaonians were part of the Epirote League until 170 BC when their territory was annexed by the Roman Republic.

Name
Due to phonetic similarity, the Athenian comic playwright Aristophanes, in his play The Knights, punningly associated the ethnonym of the Chaonians with the verb χάσκω, chásko 'to yawn', while in his play The Acharnians, with χάος, cháos 'chaos'; implying the situation that prevailed in Athenian foreign policy, and the indolent nature of Athenian politicians, respectively.

According to linguist Vladimir I. Georgiev (1981), both the region of Χαονία 'Chaonia', and the name of its inhabitants Χάονες 'Chaones, Chaonians', derive from Χάων 'Chaon', which in turn derives from the Greek *χαϝ-ών 'place with gorges'; cf. Χάον ὄρος 'Chaon mountain' in Argolis, χάος 'chaos, space, abyss', χάσκω 'to yawn', χάσμα 'chasm, gorge'. According to linguist Carlo De Simone (1985), there is limited availability on the name's etymology and as such no convincing etymology of Chaonia and Chaones (Χᾶονες, Χαῦνοι) can be given. New studies such as of linguist Panagiotis Filos (2017) assert that the toponym and tribal name have a Greek etymology, citing Radoslav Katičić, who in turn cites examples from Georgiev.

History
The Chaonians were mentioned for the first time by Thucydides in the 5th century BC. According to Strabo, the Chaonians (along with the Molossians) were the most famous among the fourteen tribes of Epirus, because they once ruled over the whole of Epirus. The Periplus of Pseudo-Scylax makes a clear distinction between the Chaonians and their northern neighbours, the Illyrian tribes that occupied the coastal and hinterland regions further north.

Some of the tribes that belonged to the Chaonians may have practiced tumulus burial during or at the end of the Bronze Age; this feature continued into the Iron Age. N. G. L. Hammond reconstructed for the period from the 6th century BC a vast northern dominion of the Chaonians in an area which expanded form the Bay of Vlorë in the south to the Korçë Plain in the north and the lakeland area in the east. According to Hammond's historical reconstruction, Chaonians might have lost some pastures, but they would have kept control of the pastures in the area that stretched from Grammos to the south-western side of the lakeland region. Also they would have suffered losses at the hands of the Taulantii and the settlers at Apollonia, who would have captured the southern part of the coastal plain, which coincides with the present-day region of Malakastra. Hammond's hypothesis is based on an information provided by Hecataeus, according to which Chaonians and Enchelei were neighboring peoples, and on the appearance of some 6th century BC tumuli in the Korça basin containing the burials of new rulers, who are considered Chaonians by Hammond. However according to Bogdani the archaeological evidence is far from certain, since there are no elements of connection between Chaonians and these new rulers, and the same consideration can be made for the historical source, especially taking into account the fact that the knowledge about the northern Chaonian tribe of the Dexaroi is limited to a single fragment of Hecataeus of Miletus. During 650 B.C, the Chaonians were the most powerful tribal state in Epirus. They were later succeeded by the Molossians.

The Illyrians and Chaonians appear to have had, at least at times, a confrontational relationship; Polybius recounts a devastating raid mounted in 230 BC by the Illyrians against Phoenice, the chief city of the Chaonians. The incident had major political ramifications where many Italian traders who were in the town at the time of the sacking were killed or enslaved by the Illyrians, prompting the Roman Republic to launch the first of the two Illyrian Wars the following year.

During the 2nd century, the Prasaebi replaced the Chaones in their control of Buthrotum, as attested in inscriptions from that period. The Prasaebi, themselves a member of the larger association 'The Chaones', consisted of at least five subsidiary tribes, since the officials and members of their community had as ethnics: Aixonios, Tharios, Kotulaios, O...-atas and Prochtheios.

Political structure

The Chaonians were settled Kata Komas meaning in a collection of villages and not in an organized polis (despite the fact that they called their community a polis) and were a tribal state in the 5th century BC. As reported by the most common ancient account Epirus was first ruled by the Chaonians, while the rule of the Molossians started only later. According to Thucydides, their leaders were chosen on an annual basis; he names two such leaders, Photius and Nikanor "from the ruling lineage". In the 4th century BC, the Chaonians adopted the term prostates (Greek: προστάτης, "ruler") to describe their leaders, like most Greek tribal states at the time. Other terms for office were grammateus (Greek: Γραμματεύς, "secretary"), demiourgoi (Greek: δημιουργοί, "creators"), hieromnemones (Greek: ἱερομνήμονες, "of the sacred memory") and synarchontes (Greek: συνάρχοντες, "co-rulers").

They were loosely associated with the rest of the Epirote tribes, including the Thesprotians and Molossians. They joined the Epirote League, founded in 325/320 BC, uniting their territories with those of the rest of the Epirotes in a loosely federated state that became a major power in the region until it was conquered by Rome in 170 BC.

Economy
Chaonia was an area where pastoral life was prominent, as is also evidenced by the local numismatic iconography. The pastoral character of the area was particularly renowned during Roman times. In Virgil's Georgics, a poem that described and idealized rural life, the author praised the goods of agriculture, contrasting the pre-eminent pastoral model; that of Chaonia. In general, Roman poets praised Chaonia as a model of bucolic life; similar to that of Arcadia. Rich Roman businessmen settled in Chaonia, where they established large villas with agricultural and livestock units. The most prominent example is that of Titus Pomponius Atticus, who built Amaltheion or Amaltheia near Bouthrotos, and bred horses and 120 herds of oxen. However, it is clear that the contrast between the agricultural and pastoral communities was very subtle, and in part, largely plasmatic. The local society was generally rural, and its inhabitants tried to achieve self-sufficiency through a number of means that complemented each other. The character of the economy was a consequence of the mountainous environment.

The descriptions of ancient authors indicate that the region was densely populated during the 4th century BC. This made the adoption of a new way of life imperative, because the nomadic or semi-nomadic economy could not sustain the ever-increasing population, while constant raids and military operations would make extensive living in unfortified villages problematic; especially with the transhumant seasonal movement of men. This required a shift to a more permanent and organized settlement, which ensured better defense and the parallel exercise of various economic activities, such as agriculture, hunting, fishing and animal husbandry; the latter, however, on a more limited scale than that of nomadic or semi-nomadic. Henceforth, there was import and export of cereals in the region, while it also served as a supply base for troops. The reorganization of the economy also created new sources of wealth, through artisanship, which improved transactions and prompted Chaonians to create their first coins in the 4th century BC. The excavation of Phoenice – the capital of the Chaonians – unearthed 800 coins, of which only 20 were issued by the Chaonians; evidence of their economic prosperity, extroversion, and independent development.

Women had rights over family property (including the slaves), and they could manage it, sell it, or even give it up, without the mediation of a male guardian. Also, it was common for slaves, after their liberation acts, to remain at the side of their former masters, for as long as the latter lived. This reveals the strong bond between the slaves and their owners; possibly due to the late adoption of slavery in the region, and the preservation of tribal ties, the core of which was the house, and therefore all the members attached to it were largely integral.

Geography

Chaonia or Chaon ( or ) was the name of the northwestern part of Epirus. It was one of the three main ethnic divisions of Epirus; the other two were Thesprotia and Molossia. Strabo in his Geography places Chaonia between the Ceraunian Mountains in the north and the River Thyamis in the south. Phoenice (Phoinike) was the capital and most important city of the Chaonians. The strength of the Chaonian tribes prevented the organized Greek city-states from establishing any colonies on the coast of Chaonia.

Their region lay on the edge of the Greek world and was far from peaceful; for many centuries, it remained a frontier area contested with the Illyrian peoples to the north. According to Šašel Kos, at the time of Pseudo-Scylax, Chaonians as well as all the peoples to the north and to the south of Chaonia were living in villages, while Greece began at the Greek polis of Ambracia. However, Šašel Kos, also stated that northern Epirus was part of the Greek world and the line stretching from the Acroceraunian mountains as far as Damastium inland (in Dassaretis) is generally accepted among modern scholars as its border.

As already known by Hecataeus in the 6th century BC, Pseudo-Scylax notes that Oricum marked the northernmost border of Chaonia (and therefore of Epirus); as such, Illyria begun north of Oricum.

According to Stocker, Chaonia in the 5th century BC was not considered part of "Greece", but was considered part of it by the beginning of the Hellenistic period. Stocker also states that there was a major cultural border between Chaonia and Illyria. On this the polis of Apollonia was founded by Greek colonists.

Language

There is today an overall consensus that the Chaonians were among the Greek-speaking population of Epirus, which spoke the North-West Doric dialect of Ancient Greek, akin to that of Aetolia, Phocis, and certain other regions, this is also attested by the available epigraphic evidence in Epirus. 
Due to the fact that Greek toponyms preserving archaic features are very densely found in the wider area, it appears, according to Vladimir I. Georgiev, that speakers of the Proto-Greek language inhabited a region which included Chaonia before the Late Bronze Age migrations (ca. 2500 BC). Eugene Borza argues that the Molossians originated from a pool of Proto-Greek tribes inhabiting northwestern Greece. Hammond argues the Chaonians and other Epirote tribes spoke Greek at least from the Dark Ages (1100–800 BC). Hammond further argues that Pseudo-Scylax's description of the situation about 380-360 BC indicates that they did not speak Illyrian and that their acceptance in 330 BC into the Epirote League is a strong indication that they spoke Greek; Chaonian inscriptions, all in Greek, began around 329 BC.

In the northern part of the region of Epirus, contact with Illyrian-speakers increased sub-dialectal variation within North-West Doric, although concrete evidence outside of onomastics is lacking. On the other hand, penetration of Greek speech, including Epirote, was much more evident among the adjacent Illyrian tribes. Filos asserts that Epirus was a largely Greek-speaking region, as indicated in epigraphic material, although a uniform picture in the sense of dialect use is far from certain, at least regarding the northern parts bordering Southern Illyria, namely Chaonia, where interaction with Southern Illyria and a certain degree of bilingualism in the northern parts must have been a reality, especially in later times. David R. Hernandez (2018) reports that, according to Pierre Cabanes (1979), that the Chaonians spoke Illyrian, the Molossians and Thesprotians Greek, and that throughout the region bilingualism in West Greek and Illyrian was predominant. Hernandez (2018) finally concludes, however, that Cabanes' theory is unlikely and that the Chaonians spoke West Greek, the same dialect used elsewhere in Epirus as well in Akarnania. Additionally the notion of any ethnic and lingual division inside Epirus was unlikely. Pseudo-Scylax describing the geographical and ethnographical situation (c. 380-360 BC), distinguished the Illyrians from the Chaonians, making it clear that the Chaonians did not speak Illyrian.

Religion
The sanctuary of Dodona was a religious site frequented by all the Epirote peoples, including the Chaonians. Chaonians constructed their own treasury, likely as a way to highlight their participation and to enhance their identity. The region of Chaonia appears as a place visited by the theoroi, in an Epidaurian list of theorodokoi. Theoroi were sent by the major Panhellenic sanctuaries throughout the Greek world, and theorodokoi's duty was to host and assist the former in preparation of the Panhellenic games and festivals. The list was compiled in 360 or 356 BC. The worship of many Greek gods is attested in Chaonia; these include Athena, Artemis, Asclepius, Zeus, Pan and Poseidon. In particular, at Bouthrotos, the worship of Athena, Asclepius and Zeus Soter is attested; the combined worship of the three, is associated with coastal areas and may have been part of a common cult that is also attested in other parts of the Greek world.

Zeus, the central figure of the Greek Pantheon, was a popular deity among the Chaonians, as well as the rest of northern Greece. Zeus Chaonius, was also associated with the Acroceraunian mountains. In Bouthrotos, he was one of the main deities with the epithet "Soter" (Zeus Soter 'Zeus the Saviour'); the epithet "Soter" is associated with the protection of sailors. In the same city, Zeus was also invoked with the epithet "Kassios". Heracles – who was a son of Zeus – was another deity that was worshipped in Bouthrotos.

The worship of Poseidon was popular in the region and Taurian Poseidon is associated with chthonic features, being protector of the sherpents and the flocks. This kind of worship was quite archaic in the region and was preserved from prehistoric Mycenaean Greece (1600-1100 B.C).

A temple dedicated to Athena Polias was erected in Chaonian territory, which is attested from an oracular lamella from Dodona dated to ca. 330–320 BC. The inscription on the lamella states: "Good fortune. The polis of the Chaonians asks Zeus Naos and Dione if it is desirable, better, and more advantageous to move and rebuild the Temple of Athena Polias." There is evidence that this temple was initially located at Bouthrotos; such as a number of Corinthian ostraca from the citadel, that bore the inscription "ΑΘΑ" (ATHA), which has been rendered as "ΑΘΑΝΑΣ" (ATHANAS) and indicates that the archaic temple of Bouthrotos was probably dedicated to Athena. According to Hadeli and Gjongecaj, the new temple of Athena Polias was moved to the capital of the Chaonians; Phoenice. Regardless of whether the temple of Athena Polias – mentioned on the lamella from Dodona – was located in Phoenice, Bouthrotos, or elsewhere, the importance and prominent position of the goddess in Chaonia is also confirmed by the coins of the ethnos, where she is depicted with a Corinthian helmet. The cult of Athena was introduced to Epirus for the first time by the Corinthian colonists.

Between the end of the 4th century and the beginning of the 3rd century BC, a temenos was assigned to the god of medicine and healing, Asclepius. The establishment of his worship probably took place under the reign of Pyrrhus; however, Pyrrhus might only be responsible for the monumental construction of the asclepeion, while the worship itself may have been inherent due to the geophysical wealth of the site. During the excavations, hydrocarbon deposits and sulfur gas were found; the latter is one of the main components of thermal springs, whose main deity was Asclepius. Liberation acts of the 2nd - 1st c. BC were found at the city's theater (western parodos and diazoma), most of which were dedicated to Asclepius. Among the recorded officials, the priest of the god is also included. The priests of Asclepius came from the local ruling class, since the inscriptions show that some people had served both as generals and priests of the god; this indicates that the cult of Asclepius was intertwined with the public affairs of the city. The publication of the liberation acts at the temene is not only characteristic of Bouthrotos, but also of the other asclepieia; such as those of Nafpaktos, Orchomenos, Chaeronia, Epidaurus, etc. With the development of Bouthrotos' urban center, Asclepius seems to have become the patron god of the city, replacing Athena, who is not mentioned in any inscription thereafter.

In ancient sources
Modern scholarship hardly denies the belonging of the Chaonians to Greek culture and ethnicity, though classical era literature preferred a more 'peripheral' connotation and described them as "barbaroi". The Greek historian Thucydides describes them as barbaroi while their "ruling family" (τὸ άρχικὸν γένος) apparently had Greek names. Crossland argues that Thucydides' writings indicate that during his lifetime, the tribes from Amphilochia northward were not Greek-speaking, though already under strong Greek influence, and they would later adopt the Greek language in the fourth century BC. On the other hand, Hammond argues that they spoke Greek during and before the time of Thucydides considering both the Greek language and Greek names of their inscriptions were not suddenly adopted. Moreover, Filos finds Crossland's view of a pre-classical semi-Hellenized Epirus untenable given the earliest Greek epigraphical evidence from the region. According to Filos, there were some local peculiarities among the Greek-speaking tribes of Epirus. Irad Malkin asserts that from references in Thucydides' work it is clear that the ancient historian was able to distinguish between various groups of Greeks, semi-Greeks, bilinguals, and non-Greeks, yet he distinguished very explicitly, even within the same coalitions, Epirote barbarians from Greeks, reporting the Epirotes as barbarians. However, Thucydides had similar views of the neighboring Aetolians and Acarnians, even though the evidence leaves no doubt that they were Greek. The term "barbarian" denoted not only clearly non-Greek populations, but also Greek populations on the fringe of the Greek world with peculiar dialects and preserving an archaic way of life that would have been incomprehensible to the inhabitants of the more developed Greek city-states to the south. Pseudo-Scymnus considered the Chaonians barbarians, while Polybius considered the Epirotes, and the Chaonians specifically, to be Greek. According to Plutarch, the Molossian king Tharrhypas was the first to introduce Greek letters and customs in Epirus, and to administer the cities with humane laws, when he was sent to Athens to be educated in the 5th century BC.

A much more reliable source about the actual views of contemporary Greeks concerning Epirus is the epigraphic material which contains the list of theorodokoi (sacred envoy-receivers whose duty was to host and assist the theoroi (θεωροί, "viewers") before the Panhellenic games and festivals), listing Greek cities and tribes, to which the major Panhellenic sanctuaries sent theoroi in Epidaurus, which includes the Epirotes. The list which was compiled in 360 or 356 BC includes the sacred envoys (members of the ruling family of each tribe or subtribe) of the Molossians, Kassopeans, Chaonians and Thesprotians. The weight of this evidence is decisive because only Greeks (Hellenes) were permitted to participate in the Panhellenic games and festivals.

Mythological origins
The Epirotic tribes sought their progenitor in the Homeric epics, similar to other tribes in Greece. The Chaonians chose the Trojan prince Helenus. Though this mythical tradition is commonly considered to have been created during the time of Alcetas, or even Pyrrhus (along with later additions that date to the Roman times), it seems that the core of the mythological genealogy of the Chaonians was already established by the 6th century BC, and its roots can be traced at the end of the 8th century BC, through the lost epic poem of Nostoi. In Virgil's Aeneid, the eponymous ancestor of the Chaonians was the Trojan hero Chaon.

According to Malkin, their founding myth may have arisen as a response to the self-definitions of the Molossians and Thesprotians. According to Hernandez, among the Epirote tribes, the Molossians viewed their descent as a mixture of Greek and Trojan, from Neoptolemus and Helenus respectively, whereas the Chaonians viewed their descent as strictly Trojan, from Helenus and Andromache; perhaps in opposition to the Greek ethnicity of the colonizers and/or the mixed origins of the southern Epirote tribes. According to Hadeli, Helenus had a rather inconspicuous role compared to other heroes in the Homeric epics, but he did possess all the qualities which could serve the aspirations of the Chaonians. Namely, he was the son of a king and a brave warrior, but above all, he was the best seer of the Trojans; a quality that pertains directly to Dodona, and can thus explain their choice, which covered ideological control over the oracle. Hadeli adds, that the presence of Trojans in Epirus, may not have been an ex nihilo invention of the Chaonians, but might stem from the now lost epics of Nostoi and the Little Iliad; an approach which refutes the argument that the Homeric myths were subsequently adopted by the locals, in order to be integrated and legitimized in the Greek world, since these traditions are attested from the Archaic period and it is highly probable that they initially pertained to the aspirations of the three main Epirotic tribes regarding the ideological establishment over their lands, natural resources, and the oracle of Dodona. She concludes that the same trend that was followed separately by the whole Greek world of the early historical period, was also embraced by Epirus, a fact that implies that the Homeric and rest of the Epic Cycle poems, would have been known in the region from around the time of their main composition, through wandering aoidoi, who traveled and recited poems throughout the Greek-speaking world.

In Virgil's Aeneid, Chaon is described as a Trojan hero and the eponymous ancestor of the Chaonians. The story is unclear as to whether he was the friend or the brother of Helenus, but in either case, he accompanied him to the court of Neoptolemus. The story concerning Chaon's death is as unclear as that of his relationship to Helenus. Chaon was either killed in a hunting accident or offered himself as a sacrifice to the gods during an epidemic, thus saving the lives of his countrymen. In either case, when Helenus became the ruler of the country, he named a part of the kingdom after Chaon. According to Hadeli, even though the Aeniad was written between 29 and 19 BC, this myth originated after the Macedonian Wars, and has its roots at least in the 2nd century BC. She explains it as an attempt of the Romans to better associate themselves with the Chaonians through a common Trojan origin (like the former had through Aeneas), and second, to disassociate them ideologically from the Molossians (and consequently the pro-Macedonian faction), since Helenus – being the Chaonian mythical progenitor – is presented as a mere slave of Neoptolemus (progenitor of the Molossians) who only came to power after his death.

List of Chaonians
Photius and Nicanor, leaders of the Chaonians in the Peloponnesian War (circa 431–421 BC).
Doropsos , theorodokos in Epidauros (circa 365 BC).
Antanor (son of Euthymides), proxenos in Delphi (325–275 BC).
Peukestos, proxenos in Thyrrheion, Acarnania (3rd century BC) .
Myrtilos, officer who gave proxeny decree to Boeotian Kallimelos (late 3rd century BC).
Boiskos (son of Messaneos), prostates (late 3rd century BC).
Lykidas (son of Hellinos), prostates (circa 232–168 BC).
-tos (son of Lysias), winner in Pale (wrestling) Panathenaics (194/193 BC).
Charops, father of Machatas, father of Charops the Younger - philoroman politicians (2nd century BC).

See also
Tribes of Epirus
Dexari

References

Citations

Sources

Further reading

Ancient tribes in Albania
Ancient tribes in Epirus
Greek tribes